David Noble (born 15 May 1967) is a former Australian rules football coach, administrator and player, best known for his tenure as the senior men's coach of the North Melbourne Football Club in 2021 and 2022. He is the Chief Executive Officer of Dick Johnson Racing.

Playing career

North Hobart
A rover from Tasmania, Noble began his senior football career at North Hobart in the Tasmanian Football League in 1985. He soon was made vice-captain of the club, and won statewide premierships in 1987 and 1989.

Fitzroy
He played mostly in the reserves at Fitzroy. He played only one more senior game for Fitzroy. He played two state of origin matches for Tasmania during his career.

Prahran
In 1992, Noble played for Prahran in the Victorian Football Association. He then served a successful captain-coaching position at the Upwey-Tecoma Football Club in the Yarra Valley Mountain District Football League in 1993 and 1994, winning two premierships and two best-and-fairest awards at the club. Noble retired from playing at the end of 1994.

Coaching career 
Following his successful captain-coaching stint at Upwey-Tecoma, Noble began a coaching career in the TAC Cup, serving as assistant coach at the newly established Oakleigh Chargers, then senior coach at the NSW/ACT Rams. He then joined AFL club the Western Bulldogs for five years from 1998-2002, serving as an assistant coach over that time as well as the reserves coach in 1998 and 1999, winning one reserves premiership.

In 2003, Noble moved to South Australia, and served as senior coach at Glenelg in the SANFL in 2003 and 2004, but did not take the club to finals. He then joined the AFL's Adelaide Crows and spent more than a decade at the club, serving as assistant coach (2005-10), list manager (2011-13) and head of football (2014-16). He was an integral part of the club’s eight finals campaigns over that ten year period.

North Melbourne Football Club senior coach (2021-2022)
Taking over a club from previous senior coach Rhyce Shaw after Shaw resigned for personal reasons and the club under Shaw had finished second-last in 2020. Noble led the club to the wooden spoon in 2021 with a 4–17–1 record. Noble was sacked as senior coach of North Melbourne with six weeks remaining in the 2022 season, after a disastrous 1–15 start to what was eventually a second consecutive wooden spoon; after the club's internal review had concluded it would dismiss Noble as a result of his poor win-loss and negative feedback towards his coaching style from staff and players, he and the club agreed to part ways immediately. Noble was replaced by assistant coach Leigh Adams as caretaker senior coach of North Melbourne for the rest of the 2022 season.

Administrative career
In September 2016, he left Adelaide and moved to become the Brisbane Lions General Manager of Football, serving there for four years and overseeing the Lions' return to finals football. In December 2022 Noble was appointed Chief Executive Officer of motor racing team Dick Johnson Racing.

Accolades
Noble was inducted into the AFL Tasmania Hall of Fame in 2016. His son John has played senior AFL football for Collingwood since 2019.

References

Holmesby, Russell and Main, Jim (2007). The Encyclopedia of AFL Footballers. 7th ed. Melbourne: Bas Publishing.

External links

"David Noble: The journey" from North Melbourne Football Club

1967 births
Fitzroy Football Club players
North Hobart Football Club players
Glenelg Football Club coaches
Living people
Australian rules footballers from Tasmania
Tasmanian State of Origin players
Tasmanian Football Hall of Fame inductees
North Melbourne Football Club coaches
Australian motorsport people